The Laurence Olivier Award for Best Sound Design is an annual award presented by the Society of London Theatre in recognition of achievements in commercial London theatre. The awards were established as the Society of West End Theatre Awards in 1976, and renamed in 1984 in honour of English actor and director Laurence Olivier.

This award was introduced in 2004, 13 years after the 1991 introduction of individual awards for Best Set Design, Best Costume Design and Best Lighting Design.

Winners and nominees

2000s

2010s

2020s

See also
 Tony Award for Best Sound Design

References

External links
 

Sound Design